The Maharajadhiraj Lakshmishwar Singh Museum is situated at Darbhanga in the Indian state of Bihar. It has the largest collection of ivory craft items in India.

History
It was established by the Government of Bihar in 1979. Most of the objects and artefacts were donated by the Erstwhile Royal Family of Darbhanga Raj to the Government of Bihar.

Exhibition
The exhibition has a collection of a number of objects and weapons made of gold, silver, and ivory. For example; Raj Singhasan Hall has the collection of the royal throne of Maharaja Rameshwar Singh made of gold and silver, and an ivory throne that was once used by the rulers of the Darbhanga Raj, a royal chair made of ivory and polished cushioning. There are also separate halls dedicated to rare weapons and wooden artefacts.

See also
 Chandradhari Museum.

References

1. ^16 November 2017 cm-revisits-history-at-twin-museums The Telegraph

2. maharaja-laxmiswar-singh-museum-in-darbhanga

3. payment-delay-hits-conservation-of-rare-items-manuscripts-in-patna-and-darbhanga-museums

4.Maharajadhiraja-Lakshmishwar-Singh-Museum

Museums in Bihar
Darbhanga
Tourist attractions in Darbhanga district
1979 establishments in Bihar
Museums established in 1979